Eslam Ahmed Shabaan (born 31 December 1997) is an Egyptian track and field athlete who competes in the hammer throw. He was the gold medallist at the 2016 African Championships in Athletics.

He had a successful career in age category tournaments. He placed fourth at the 2011 World Youth Championships in Athletics. In the junior category he was 21st at the 2012 World Junior Championships and was the winner at the 2013 African Junior Athletics Championships.

He entered the senior ranks in 2015 and cleared seventy metres for the first time in 2016.

International competitions

References

External links

Living people
1994 births
Egyptian male hammer throwers
Athletes (track and field) at the 2010 Summer Youth Olympics
21st-century Egyptian people